Live Phish Vol. 19 was recorded live at the Colonial Theater in Keene, New Hampshire, on July 12, 1991.

This concert was recorded during the middle of the band's 1991 summer tour with the Giant Country Horns - a three-piece horn section that would learn and perform individual sections of Phish songs during concerts. Two of the three members of the horn section - Dave Grippo and Russell Remington - performed with Trey Anastasio's solo band in the 21st century.

Rarities include two Charlie Parker covers: the one-time-only performance of "Moose the Mooche" and the Jaco Pastorius-infused "Donna Lee." Drummer Jon Fishman also performs The Doors' "Touch Me," complemented thoroughly by the horn section.

Track listing

Disc one
Set one:
"Dinner and a Movie" (Anastasio, Pollak) - 4:09
"Bouncing Around the Room" (Anastasio, Marshall) - 3:35
"Buried Alive" (Anastasio) - 2:15
"Flat Fee" (Anastasio) - 2:59
"Reba" (Anastasio) - 11:31
"The Landlady" (Anastasio) - 5:49
"Bathtub Gin" (Anastasio, Goodman) - 7:53
"Donna Lee" (Parker) - 4:08
"AC/DC Bag" (Anastasio) - 5:47
"Rocky Top" (Bryant, Bryant) - 2:27
"Cavern" (Anastasio, Herman, Marshall) - 4:31
"David Bowie" (Anastasio) - 11:09
Set two:
"Golgi Apparatus" (Anastasio, Marshall, Szuter, Woolf) - 5:07
"The Squirming Coil" (Anastasio, Marshall) - 7:41

Disc two
Set two, continued:
"Moose the Mooche" (Parker) - 5:01
"Tweezer" (Anastasio, Fishman, Gordon, McConnell) - 10:30
"My Sweet One" (Fishman) - 2:09
"Gumbo" (Anastasio, Fishman) - 5:54
"Mike's Song" (Gordon) - 6:27
"I Am Hydrogen" (Anastasio, Daubert, Marshall) - 2:43
"Weekapaug Groove" (Anastasio, Fishman, Gordon, McConnell) - 6:03
"Touch Me" (Krieger) - 5:09
"The Oh Kee Pa Ceremony" (Anastasio) - 1:45
"Suzy Greenberg" (Anastasio, Pollak) - 6:29
Encore:
"Sweet Adeline" (Armstrong, Gerard) - 1:58
"Frankenstein" (Winter) - 6:22
Encore two:
"Fee" (Anastasio) - 5:09
"Tweezer Reprise" (Anastasio, Fishman, Gordon, McConnell) - 3:23

Personnel
Phish
Trey Anastasio - guitars, lead vocals, drums on "Touch Me", acapella vocals on "Sweet Adeline"
Page McConnell - organ, backing vocals, acapella vocals on "Sweet Adeline"
Mike Gordon - bass, backing vocals, lead vocals on "Mike's Song", acapella vocals on "Sweet Adeline"
Jon Fishman - drums, backing vocals, lead vocals on "Touch Me", trombone on "Touch Me", acapella vocals on "Sweet Adeline"
The Giant Country Horns
Carl Gerhard - trumpet
Dave Grippo - saxophone
Russell Remington - saxophone

19
2003 live albums
Elektra Records live albums